Mexican Light and Power Company was a Canadian-owned electrical generation and distribution company in Mexico founded in 1902 or 1905.

References

External links
 The Necaxa development of the Mexican light and power company
 Mexico - Second Mexican Light and Power Project (English)
 Electric light and power in the city of Mexico

Energy companies established in 1902
Electric power companies of Mexico
Defunct energy companies of Mexico
1902 establishments in Mexico